1908 Hong Kong–Shanghai Cup was the 1st staging of Hong Kong-Shanghai Cup. The host team Hong Kong captured the trophy by winning 3-0. Both Hong Kong and Shanghai teams were formed by non-Chinese players.

Result

References

1908 in association football
1908 in Hong Kong
Hong Kong–Shanghai Cup